D22 may refer to:

Ships 
 General Moran, an Almirante Clemente-class destroyer of the Venezuelan Navy
 , a Fletcher-class destroyer of the Hellenic Navy
 , a W-class destroyer of the Royal Navy and Royal Australian Navy
 , a Battle-class destroyer of the Royal Navy
 , a Fletcher-class destroyer of the Spanish Navy

Other uses 
 D22 road (Croatia)
 Darmstadt D-22, a German sport plane
 Dublin 22, a postal district in Ireland
 Kelantan State Route D22, now Malaysia Federal Route 196
 LNER Class D22, a class of British steam locomotives
 Nissan Navara, a pickup Truck